Judith Schaechter is a Philadelphia-based artist known for her work in the medium of stained glass. Her pieces often use symbolism from stained glass and Gothic traditions, but the distorted faces and figures in her work recall a 20th century German Expressionist painting style and her subject matter is secular. Shaechter's work often involves images that might be considered disturbing such as death, disease, or violence. Early Schaechter pieces, for example, such as King of Maggots and Vide Futentes make use of memento mori, symbols of death found in church architecture during medieval times.

Biography

Schaechter was born in Gainesville, Florida, in 1961, but spent her formative years growing up in Massachusetts. She has served on the faculty of numerous art schools, such as the Rhode Island School of Design. She is currently an Adjunct Professor in the Crafts Department at The University of the Arts in Philadelphia, Pennsylvania and Adjunct Faculty at the New York Academy of Art in New York, New York. Schaechter has also taught courses at Pilchuck Glass School in Seattle, Penland School of Crafts, Toyama Institute of Glass (Toyama, Toyama, Japan) and Australian National University in Canberra, Australia.

She illustrated the cover for musician Andy Prieboy's 1991 album Montezuma Was a Man of Faith. Her work has been exhibited in the Renwick Gallery of the Smithsonian Institution, the Museum of Arts and Design in New York City, the Victoria and Albert Museum in London, and the Fine Arts Museums of San Francisco. Schaechter's Bigtop Flophouse Bedspins appeared in the 2002 Whitney Biennial. She has artwork in the collections of the Metropolitan Museum of Art, the Victoria and Albert Museum, the Hermitage Museum, the Philadelphia Museum of Art, the Corning Museum of Glass, the Renwick Gallery, among other public and private collections.

Her stained glass artwork has been included in two survey textbooks: Women Artists by Nancy Heller and Makers: a History of American Studio Craft by Bruce Metcalf and Janet Koplos.

Her piece Birth of Venus was included in the Renwick's 50th anniversary exhibition "This Present Moment: Crafting a Better World".

References

Further reading
 Baker, Alex (Foreword), Judith Schaechter, Extra Virgin: The Stained Glass of Judith Schaechter, Tonearm Productions (2006) 
Johnson, Ken. ART IN REVIEW; Judith Schaechter -- 'Extra Virgin', The New York Times, February 28, 2003. Retrieved 2008-06-03

Official Website of United States Artists

Sullivan, Robert. "Through the Looking Glass: Judith Schaechter." American Craft, February/March (2009): 62-69.

External links
2011 Oral History interview with Mija Riedel for Archives of American Art

American stained glass artists and manufacturers
1961 births
Living people
Pew Fellows in the Arts
University of the Arts (Philadelphia) faculty
Rhode Island School of Design alumni
Rhode Island School of Design faculty
20th-century American artists
20th-century American women artists
21st-century American artists
21st-century American women artists
National Endowment for the Arts Fellows
American glass artists
Women glass artists
Fellows of the American Craft Council
American women academics